

The Emmanuel Association of Churches is a Methodist denomination in the conservative holiness movement.

The formation of the Emmanuel Association is a part of the history of Methodism in the United States. It was formed in 1937 as a result of a schism in the Pilgrim Holiness Church, led by Ralph Goodrich Finch, the former general superintendent of Foreign Missions in that denomination. It is one of the oldest denominations in the conservative holiness movement. Like other Methodist bodies, it is governed by a General Conference.

The Emmanuel Association's holiness standards are codified in the text titled "Principles of Holy Living". The denomination is opposed to warfare, thus falling into the Holiness Methodist Pacifists subgroup of the holiness movement. It advocates for the principle of nonresistance:
The Emmanuel Association is based in Alliance, Ohio. It has had churches in cities across the world, including Colorado Springs (Colorado), Campo (Colorado), Hartman (Colorado), Rocky Ford (Colorado), Hayden Lake (Idaho), Logansport (Indiana), Terre Haute (Indiana), Hunter (Kansas), Tollesboro (Kentucky), Kansas City (Missouri), Hayes Center (Nebraska), Shubert (Nebraska), Vineland (New Jersey), Alliance (Ohio), Cincinnati (Ohio), East Palestine (Ohio), Lisbon (Ohio), Little York (Ohio), New Philadelphia (Ohio), Newton Falls (Ohio), Octa (Ohio), Salem (Ohio), Xenia (Ohio), Garrett (Pennsylvania), Gratz (Pennsylvania), Herndon (Pennsylvania), White Haven (Pennsylvania), Watertown (South Dakota), Touchet (Washington), Reed (West Virginia), and Bethesda (Ontario), as well as in parts of Guatemala, Bolivia and Africa.

The association holds an annual camp meeting at Hickory Grove Campground in Tollesboro and its tabernacle was built in memory of Reverend R. G. Finch. The connection ran Peoples Bible College in Colorado Springs until May 1994.

See also 

Immanuel Missionary Church

References

Notes

Citations

Methodist denominations
Methodist denominations in North America
Holiness denominations
Holiness movement
History of Methodism in the United States
Christian organizations established in 1937
1937 establishments in the United States
Holiness pacifism